Algol is a star system.

Algol or ALGOL may also refer to:

Science and technology
 Algol variable or Algol-type binaries, a class of eclipsing binary stars, named after its most famous example

Programming languages
 ALGOL (short for Algorithmic Language), a family of computer programming languages:
 ALGOL 58:
 NELIAC
 JOVIAL
 MAD (programming language)
 ALGOL 60:
 Burroughs Algol
 Elliott ALGOL
 Dartmouth ALGOL 30
 ALGOL W
 Simula
 DG/L
 S-algol
 ALGOL X
 ALGOL Y
 ALGOL 68:
 ALGOL 68-R
 ALGOL 68RS
 ALGOL 68C
 FLACC
 ALGOL 68-RT
 ALGAMS
 Interactive ALGOL 68
 ALGOL 68S

Art and entertainment
 Algol (fanzine), a science fiction fanzine edited by Andrew I. Porter
 Algol (film), a 1920 science fiction film directed by Hans Werckmeister
 Algol (magazine), a 1947 Catalan avant-garde magazine
 Algol (Phantasy Star), a fictional planetary system in the Phantasy Star computer role-playing game
 Algol, a sword in the MMORPG Final Fantasy XI
 Algol, a character from the Soul series of fighting games

Transportation
 MV Algol, a Swedish coastal tanker
 USS Algol (AKA-54), a U.S. Navy vessel
 SS Algol (T-AKR-287), a U.S. Navy vessel
 Algol (rocket stage), the Aerojet-produced first stage of the "Scout" rocket
 Algol-class vehicle cargo ship, currently the fastest cargo ships in the world